The Sun Inn is a Grade II listed public house overlooking the village pond at 7 Church Road, Barnes in the London Borough of Richmond upon Thames. It  was built as a coffee-house in the mid-18th century, but the architect is not known.

The Sun Inn is now  part of the Mitchells & Butlers chain.

References

External links
Official website
Photograph of The Sun Inn, Barnes, in about 1860, held at Orleans House Gallery

18th-century establishments in England
Barnes, London
Buildings and structures completed in the 18th century
Coffeehouses and cafés in London
Grade II listed buildings in the London Borough of Richmond upon Thames
Grade II listed pubs in London
Mitchells & Butlers
Pubs in the London Borough of Richmond upon Thames